The .22 Bench Rest Remington cartridge, commonly referred to as the .22 BR Remington, is a wildcat cartridge commonly used in varmint hunting and benchrest shooting.  It is based on the .308×1.5-inch Barnes cartridge, necked down to .22 caliber, lengthened by .020 inches and with the shoulder angle increased to 30°.  It was first developed in approximately 1963 by Jim Stekl, and in 1978 Remington standardized the dimensions.  It is renowned for its high velocities and excellent accuracy.

References

External links
 .22 BR Reloading Information - Accurate Powder
 .22 BR Reloading Information - Sierra
 .22 BR Ballistic Information
 .22 BR Cartridge Guide - 6mmBR.com
 .22 BR Remington Cartridge - The Reload Bench
 .22 BR Remington - Reloader's Nest

See also
.20 BR
.20 Ferguson Ace
.20 Magna
List of rifle cartridges
Table of handgun and rifle cartridges

Pistol and rifle cartridges
Remington Arms cartridges
Wildcat cartridges